Abimbola "Bim" Afolami  (born 11 February 1986) is a British Conservative Party politician. He has served as the Member of Parliament (MP) for Hitchin and Harpenden since the 2017 general election.

Early life
Afolami was born and brought up in Crowthorne, Berkshire. His father Samuel is a Nigerian consultant doctor in the NHS, who moved to the UK in his early twenties.

Afolami was educated at Bishopsgate School, Eton College and University College, Oxford, where he read Modern History, served as Librarian of the Oxford Union Society, and played football for the university team.

Before he became an MP, Afolami worked as a corporate lawyer at Freshfields, and Simpson Thacher & Bartlett, and then as a senior executive at HSBC.

Political career
Afolami was the Conservative Party candidate for Lewisham Deptford at the 2015 general election, where he finished in second place with 7,056 votes. Afolami voted "Remain" in the 2016 referendum on EU membership. He was selected as the Conservative candidate for Hitchin and Harpenden constituency in 2017 following the announcement that the sitting Conservative MP, Peter Lilley, was to stand down.

He has described Winston Churchill as his "biggest hero". Afolami has generally voted against UK membership of the EU whilst in Parliament, following the Conservative whip.

In 2018, Afolami was named one of the Franco-British Council's Young Leaders. In January that year, it was revealed that Afolami had claimed £2,000 in expenses for subscription to the European Research Group. In April, Afolami was a member of the delegation to Beijing for the tenth Anniversary Leadership Forum, led by David Lidington MP. The Forum, entitled "Partners for Progress: Strengthening the UK-China relationship in the Golden Era", aimed to discuss practical cooperation between the UK and China. It was announced in May that Afolami would be one of 14 members of the Conservative Reform Group, a group of centrist Conservative MPs. At the end of 2018, Afolami joined the Steering Committee of the Constitution Reform Group, a cross-party pressure group chaired by Robert Gascoyne-Cecil, 7th Marquess of Salisbury, which supports the Act of Union Bill 2018, a private member's bill introduced by Lord Lisvane in the House of Lords on 9 October 2018.

In September 2018, Afolami was appointed parliamentary private secretary in the Department for Transport. In December, Afolami announced his support for Theresa May's Brexit deal. In February 2019, Afolami was appointed PPS to the Secretary of State for International Development, followed by his appointment as PPS to the Secretary of State for International Trade, Liz Truss. He was subsequently appointed as PPS to the Secretary of State for Work and Pensions, Therese Coffey. In April 2021, a private member's bill introduced by Afolami, the British Library Board (Power to Borrow) Act 2021, gained royal assent.

He was appointed in September 2021 as Parliamentary Private Secretary to the Foreign Secretary, Liz Truss.

Afolami was appointed in November 2021 as Parliamentary Private Secretary to the Secretary of State for Digital, Culture, Media and Sport, Nadine Dorries, and served in this role until his appointment as Vice Chairman of the Conservative Party for Youth in February 2022.

Afolami is Chair of PRASEG, the cross-party Parliamentary Renewable & Sustainable Energy Group, the largest and longest standing energy and climate change group in Westminster. In this role, Afolami plays a key role driving parliamentary activity relating to the UK's Presidency of COP26.

Afolami is Chair of the All-Party Parliamentary Group on Credit Unions and a Commissioner for the Financial Inclusion Commission, a financial inclusion campaign group.

He is active in supporting charities and other voluntary groups. He is patron of Harpenden Spotlight on Africa a charity working in health and education in rural Uganda. He is also patron of GRIT (Growing Resilience in Teens) and Tilehouse Counselling, two mental health charities in his constituency. Afolami also sits on the advisory board of the Social Market Foundation and on the Programme Committee of the Ditchley Foundation.

On 5 July 2022, whilst being interviewed live on television, Afolami resigned from his role as Vice Chair of the Conservative Party, owing to the recent scandals in government under Boris Johnson.

References

External links

1986 births
People from Crowthorne
Living people
Conservative Party (UK) MPs for English constituencies
UK MPs 2017–2019
English people of Nigerian descent
People educated at Eton College
People educated at Scaitcliffe School
Alumni of University College, Oxford
Simpson Thacher & Bartlett
UK MPs 2019–present
English people of Yoruba descent
Yoruba politicians
HSBC people
Black British MPs